The Sidrón Cave is a non-carboniferous limestone karst cave system located in the Piloña municipality of Asturias, northwestern Spain, where Paleolithic rock art and the fossils of more than a dozen Neanderthals were found. Declared a "Partial Natural Reserve" in 1995, the site also serves as a retreat for five species of bats and is the place of discovery of two species of Coleoptera (beetles).

Description 

In 1994, human remains were found accidentally in the cave. They were initially suspected to be from the Spanish Civil War because Republican fighters used to hide there; however, later analysis shows that the remains actually belong to Neanderthals.

Galería del Osario 

The primary gallery of interest at the Sidron cave is the Ossuary Gallery or Tunnel of Bones (Galería del Osario), where the remains of several Neanderthals were found. The Galería del Osario was excavated from 2000 to 2013.  The Neanderthal remains were all recovered from a single layer, Stratum III.

The associated archaeological assemblage consists of 53 stone tools; nonhuman bones are very scarce. The only other species present of similar size is red deer. The remains of a few small mammals and gastropods were also found.

Neanderthal finds
Researchers recovered more than 2500 hominin fossil elements from the site.  The minimum number of individuals from Sidrón Cave is 13. The age of these remains of three men, three adolescent boys, four women, and three infants has been estimated to about 49,000 years.

The fact that the bones are excellently preserved with very limited erosion and no large carnivore tooth marks and the unusual deposition of the bones, mixed into a jumble of gravel and mud, suggests that these Neanderthals did not die in this spot but an exterior location. A number of scenarios of how these "members of an extended family" might have ended up in a  room-sized space, dubbed the Tunnel of Bones included flooding, cave collapse, and disposal by cannibals. Evidence for cannibalism includes "the presence of cut marks, flakes, percussion pitting, conchoidal scars, and adhering flakes".  Projection exists that they were dropped into the cave in a single event via a collapse of nearby fissures above the site or, by influx of storm water.

Samples 

 Source:

Morphology

Morphologically, the El Sidrón humans show a large number of Neanderthal lineage-derived features even though certain traits place the sample at the limits of Neanderthal variation. Integrating the El Sidrón human mandibles into the larger Neanderthal sample reveals a north–south geographic patterning. The cave is in the northern portion, southern Neanderthals show broader faces with increased lower facial heights.

Ontogeny
The relatively well-preserved specimen of a juvenile Neanderthal recovered from the Galería del Osario, El Sidrón J1, allowed researchers to study the ontogeny of Neanderthals. By analyzing its dentition, researchers estimate that El Sidrón J1 was between 7 and 8 years old at the time of death. Around 36% of the juvenile specimen's remains was recovered, including key cranial, dental and vertebral column elements. 138 fossil elements were recovered, including 30 dental elements and a complete mandible. Based on the robustness of the specimen, researchers guess that the specimen was likely male.

El Sidrón J1 exhibits many traits of delayed maturation.  At the time of death, 
El Sidrón J1's brain was likely not yet fully developed.
(). At a comparable age, typical modern human juveniles reach around 95% of the average adult human cranial capacity. Additionally, the juvenile specimen exhibits an unusual developmental feature; the neurocentral synchondrosis between his thoracic and C1 vertebrae had not yet fused; typically, this fusion occurs around 2 years earlier in modern humans.

Other paleoanthropologists like Marcia Ponce de León and Christoph Zollikofer have cautioned to interpret the brain size as sign of delayed maturation, because of the small case number and lack of statistical evidence and Tanya Smith noted that the assumption depends on the accuracy of the tooth's age

Archaeogenetics
Ancient Neanderthal mtDNA was partially sequenced in HVR region for three distinct Neanderthals from El Sidrón cave (441, 1253, and 1351c). Researchers also sequenced the partial nuclear genomes from several individuals from the cave. 1253 and 1351c have the same mutations at position A-911, G-977 in exon 7 of FOXP2 gene, known as the "language gene", as found in present-day humans.

In 2017, researchers successfully sequenced DNA from soil samples taken from Stratum III at El Sidrón. They were able to identify Neanderthal mtDNA sequences; the results suggested that the sequenced mtDNA belonged to more than one individual.

Neanderthal Y chromosome
The first sequencing of the Neanderthal Y chromosome was successfully completed from a specimen from Sidrón Cave. Based on this sample, researchers estimate that Neanderthals diverged from the common human ancestor around 590,000 years ago. The Sidrón Cave Y chromosome had never been identified before from other fossil hominin specimens and is not found in modern humans. The Sidrón Cave Y chromosome coded for several minor histocompatibility antigen genes that differ from that of modern humans.

Diet
Recent research investigating the Neanderthals remains recovered from El Sidrón have provided evidence that their diet would have consisted primarily of pine nuts, moss and mushrooms. This is contrasted by evidence from other European locations which point to a more carnivorous diet.

See also 
 List of fossil sites
 Atapuerca Mountains
 Sima de las Palomas

References

External links
 More Cave news solociencia.com
 BiologyOnline.com

Prehistoric sites in Spain
Caves of Spain
Stone Age sites in Europe
Landforms of Asturias
Geography of Asturias
Neanderthal sites
Paleolithic Europe
Bien de Interés Cultural landmarks in Asturias